Dmitriy Shevchenko is the name of:

 Dmitry Shevchenko (fencer) (born 1967), Russian fencer
 Dmitry Shevchenko (discus thrower) (born 1968), Russian discus thrower